George Elias Tuckett (December 4, 1835, Exeter, England - February 19, 1900) was mayor of Hamilton, Ontario in 1896.

Tuckett built a fortune during the American Civil War, cornering a chunk of the tobacco market. He also founded the Tuckett Tobacco Company  in 1857. It was acquired by Imperial Tobacco in 1930.

He is buried in the Tuckett family crypt, located in Hamilton Cemetery.

In 2005, a Bursary, The George Elias Tuckett Bursaries was established in his memory.

External links
 Biography at the Dictionary of Canadian Biography Online
 1896 - George Elias Tuckett
 Resting comfortably- The Hamilton Spectator (Jun 10, 2006)

References

Mayors of Hamilton, Ontario
British emigrants to Canada
1835 births
1900 deaths